Dugo ng Pusakal is a 1988 Filipino action drama film directed by Manuel 'Fyke' Cinco. The film stars Anthony Alonzo, Eddie Rodriguez, Jean Saburit, Dante Rivero, Paquito Diaz, Romy Diaz, Zandro Zamora, Lito Anzures, Mon Godiz, and Dick Israel. Produced by Filipinas Productions, it was released on October 27, 1988, as part of the Chamber of Progressive Filipino Motion Picture Producers Film Festival.

Critic Lav Diaz gave Dugo ng Pusakal a mixed review, stating that the film's numerous forced scenes lessened the quality of its focus on character psychology. Diaz would later become the co-writer for Cinco's 1993 film Galvez: Hanggang sa Dulo ng Mundo Hahanapin Kita.

Cast
Anthony Alonzo as Karlo
Eddie Rodriguez
Jean Saburit
Dante Rivero
Paquito Diaz
Romy Diaz
Zandro Zamora
Lito Anzures
Mon Godiz
Dick Israel
Baldo Marro
Gwen Manalo
Rachell Lobangco
Ernie Forte
Romy Romulo
Joey Padilla
Rene Matias
Danny Labra
Vic Belaro
Nonoy de Guzman
Eddie Tuazon
Rey Solo

Release
Dugo ng Pusakal was graded "A" by the Movie and Television Review and Classification Board (MTRCB), indicating a "Very Good" quality. The film was released on October 27, 1988, as Filipinas Productions' entry to the Chamber of Progressive Filipino Motion Picture Producers Film Festival.

Critical response
Lav Diaz, writing for the Manila Standard, gave the film a mixed review. Diaz commended its focus on the psychological effects of violence similar to the action films Boy Negro and Sandakot Na Bala, the latter also written by Jose N. Carreon, but stated that Dugo ng Pusakal does not reach the level of those works, its quality diluted from having too many "forced and clumsy situations." Diaz would later co-write the screenplay to director Manuel Cinco's 1993 film Galvez: Hanggang sa Dulo ng Mundo Hahanapin Kita.

References

External links

1988 films
1988 action films
Action films based on actual events
Filipino-language films
Philippine action films
Films directed by Manuel Cinco